Morrisville Middle/Senior High School is a middle school/high school located in Morrisville, Bucks County, Pennsylvania, United States. The school is part of the School District of the Borough of Morrisville. The district's area is approximately two square miles. Due to the district's small size, there is no busing; all students walk to school.

Academics
The three grades that make up the middle school (6th-8th) are taught by grade level teams consisting of a science, math, English, social studies, and special education teacher. The students also receive instruction in special subjects such as business, art, music, world language, and physical education.

High school departments
Math
English
Social studies
Science
Art
Music
Technology education
Business
Wellness
Foreign Languages

Athletics
Morrisville High School is governed by the Pennsylvania Interscholastic Athletic Association (PIAA) in District 1, and is a member of the Bicentennial Athletic League. The girls' softball team has won the BAL title two years in a row, in 2007 and 2009. The boys' baseball team also won the BAL title two years in a row, in 2008 and 2009. The football team won both the BAL and IFL titles in 2012.

Notable alumni 
 Willard Curtin, politician
 Dick Hart, former professional football player
 Danny Napoleon, former professional baseball player
 Mike Vreeswyk, former Temple Owls and professional basketball player

References

External links
Morrisville School District website

Public high schools in Pennsylvania
Schools in Bucks County, Pennsylvania
Public middle schools in Pennsylvania